Douglas or Doug Roberts may also refer to:

People
 Doug Roberts (ice hockey) (born 1942), retired American ice hockey player
 Doug Roberts, Australian music producer, of Into the Blue (Monique Brumby album) and others
 Douglas B. Roberts (born 1947), former Treasurer of Michigan, U.S.
 Douglas Roberts (1919–1976) was an Australian painter and art critic.

Fictional characters
 Doug Roberts, architect played by Paul Newman in the 1974 film The Towering Inferno